James R. Grossman is an American historian who is the executive director of the American Historical Association.

Works

References

American Historical Association
Historians of African Americans
Year of birth missing (living people)
Living people
Place of birth missing (living people)